Men's Giant Slalom World Cup 2001/2002

Final point standings

In Men's Giant Slalom World Cup 2001/02 all results count.

References
 fis-ski.com

World Cup
FIS Alpine Ski World Cup men's giant slalom discipline titles